Ancistrus multispinis is a species of catfish in the family Loricariidae. It is native to South America, where it occurs in the Atlantic coastal drainage of eastern Brazil, ranging from the Macacu River to the Maquiné River. The species reaches 14.2 cm (5.6 inches) SL. The species has nocturnal habits and has been used in studies on the impacts of deltamethrin on fish blood in Brazil.

References 

multispinis
Fish described in 1912
Catfish of South America
Fish of Brazil